Michael S. Rucinski (born December 12, 1963) is an American retired professional ice hockey center who played in the National Hockey League for the Chicago Blackhawks.

Career 
Rucinski played one regular season and two post season games for the Chicago Blackhawks. He was also a member of the Salt Lake Golden Eagles, Saginaw Hawks, and Indianapolis Ice of the International Hockey League.

Career statistics

References

External links
 

1963 births
Living people
American men's ice hockey centers
American people of Polish descent
Chicago Blackhawks players
Ice hockey players from Illinois
Indianapolis Ice players
Moncton Golden Flames players
People from Wheeling, Illinois
Salt Lake Golden Eagles (IHL) players
Saginaw Hawks players
UIC Flames men's ice hockey players
Undrafted National Hockey League players